The 2020 Hungaroring FIA Formula 3 round is a motor racing event scheduled to be held on 18 and 19 July 2020 at the Hungaroring in Mogyoród, Hungary. It is the third round of the 2020 FIA Formula 3 Championship, and will run in support of the 2020 Hungarian Grand Prix.

Classification

Qualifying
The Qualifying session was scheduled to take place on 17 July 2020 at 14:00 local time, however, due to excessive surface water on the track from the rain, the session was stopped after spins from Lirim Zendeli and Liam Lawson at turn 8.  As a result, the FIA announced the session would not be restarted. Qualifying was, therefore, rescheduled to 19:05 local time.

Feature Race

Sprint Race

Standings after the event

Drivers' Championship standings

Teams' Championship standings

 Note: Only the top five positions are included for both sets of standings.

See also
2020 Hungarian Grand Prix
2020 Hungaroring Formula 2 round

Notes

References

External links
Official website

|- style="text-align:center"
|width="35%"|Previous race:
|width="30%"|FIA Formula 3 Championship2020 season
|width="40%"|Next race:

Hungaroring
Budapest Formula 3